"3500" is a 2015 song by Travis Scott off the album Rodeo

3500 or variant, may also refer to:

In general
 A.D. 3500, a year in the 4th millennium CE
 3500 BC, a year in the 4th millennium BCE
 3500, a number in the 3000 (number) range

Products
 Nokia 3500 classic, a cellphone

Automotive
 GM 3500 engine (disambiguation), several different car engines from General Motors
 Maserati 3500 GT, a sportscar
 New Venture Gear 3500 transmission, a five-gear overdrive automotive transmission
 Ram 3500, a model of pickup truck from Ram division of Stellantis
 Rover 3500 (disambiguation), several different cars from Rover

Rail
 Keisei 3500 series electric multiple unit train class
 Meitetsu 3500 series electric multiple unit train class

 NS 3500, an early-20th-century steam locomotive class
 NS 3500 (ex-SBB), a mid-20th-century steam locomotive class
 Queensland Railways 3500/3600 class, a class of electric locomotives

Places
 3500 Kobayashi, an asteroid in the Asteroid Belt, the 3500th asteroid registered
 Hawaii Route 3500, a state highway
 3500 (District of Peqin), one of the postal codes in Albania
 Catskill High Peaks (aka The 3500s), a collection of mountains in the Catskills with peak heights above

Other uses
 "Three-Five-Zero-Zero", an anti-war song from the stage musical Hair
 3500 South MAX, a BRT bus line in Salt Lake County, Utah, USA
 3500th Pilot Training Wing of the U.S. Air Force
 3500 metre race-walk, a race walking event at the Olympics

See also

 Catskill Mountain 3500 Club (aka '3500 Club'), a peakbagging organization
 , a WWI U.S. Navy cargo ship
 
 S3500 (disambiguation)